John Albaret (13 October 1878 – 18 July 1969) was a Swiss fencer. He competed at the 1920, 1924 and 1928 Summer Olympics in individual and team épée and foil events. His best result was fifth place in the team épée in 1920.

References

External links
 

1878 births
1969 deaths
Swiss male épée fencers
Olympic fencers of Switzerland
Fencers at the 1920 Summer Olympics
Fencers at the 1924 Summer Olympics
Fencers at the 1928 Summer Olympics
Sportspeople from Geneva
Swiss male foil fencers